Dhar is a city in Madhya Pradesh, India.

Dhar may also refer to:

India
 Dhar (guerrilla warfare), a military tactic in Indian history
 Dhar (surname), a surname of Bengali or Kashmiri origin
 Dhar (Lok Sabha constituency), in Madhya Pradesh
 Dhar (Vidhan Sabha constituency), in Madhya Pradesh
 Dhar, Parbhani, in Maharashtra
 Dhar district, India, in Madhya Pradesh
 Dhar railway station, in Dhar district, Madhya Pradesh
 Dhar State, a princely state of British Raj

Other uses
 Dhar, Mauritania
 Dhar District, Yemen, in the Shabwah Governorate
 Dhar Braxton, American singer

See also